The Big Lemon is a bus and coach operator in Brighton, East Sussex, Bristol and Bath. It is registered as a Community Interest Company.

History
 

The Big Lemon was founded by Tom Druitt in 2007. After gaining an operator licence, the first public transport route was launched on 1 September 2007. Route 42X originally operated from Brighton Station to Falmer Station, with hopes to expand the operation with more routes. After lower than expected passenger numbers, and competition from Brighton & Hove, the company scaled down the level of service, re-launching it in January 2008, and to reconsider its operating model. From 7 to 29 January 2008, the service operated on a reduced frequency, ending once the original route registration expired after the mandated period.

Route 42/42A/N42 was The Big Lemon's first public bus service, originating from its service 42X. Service 42 operated from Churchill Square to Sussex University via Lewes Road. During the evenings the route number changed to 42A and served West Street. It would later be renumbered N42. The N42 charged higher fares as it operated from 00:00 – 04:00. In 2011 the company renumbered routes 42A and N42 to 42.

Route 43 ran from September 2010 - January 2011, focusing on student trade and operating from Old Steine during the day and Hove during the evening up to Brighton University's Falmer campus.

Route 44 was introduced at the same time as route 43 in September 2010, operating from Churchill Square to Saltdean.

In September 2012 The Big Lemon successfully tendered to operate route 52 between Brighton Marina and Woodingdean which also goes to Ovingdean under contract to Brighton & Hove City Council.

On 17 March 2017, it was announced that Norman Baker, the former Liberal Democrat MP and Parliamentary Under Secretary of State for the Department for Transport, had been appointed managing director of the Big Lemon. Baker resigned in January 2018.

On 17 September 2017 , The Big Lemon took over routes 16, between Portslade and Hangleton, 47, between Brighton station and East Saltdean, 56, between Knoll estate and Patcham , 57, between Brighton station and East Saltdean and 66 which goes in a circular route around Portslade and Hangleton. Additionally, one Saturday morning journey on Brighton & Hove's route 21A, from Goldstone Valley to Brighton Marina, has been operated by the Big Lemon since 16th September 2018. From 29 April 2019, Route 66 was withdrawn and incorporated into route 47, and Route 56 was replaced with an extension to Routes 47 and 52.

Seaford & District 
The Big Lemon had partnered up with Lewes-based Seaford and District to create a coach company called "Brighton Horizon Coaches" on 4 August 2020. Together they had set up a fleet of 11 coaches.

Five months later, on the 9th of January 2021, Seaford and District was acquired by The Big Lemon, with Ryan Wrotny taking over management of the company. David Mulpeter, the company's Managing Director, was said to be taking his first steps into retirement following 10 and a half years running the company since its founding in 2010. The operating licences, however, will remain separate.

Expansion into the West of England
In September 2022, following the closure of the HCT Group in Bristol, The Big Lemon announced that they would be operating services in the city supported by subsidy from the West of England Combined Authority. On 30 September 2022, the traffic commissioner approved the licence for The Big Lemon to operate bus services in Bristol. The Big Lemon's four Bristol routes (505, 506, 515 & 516) commenced operations on Monday 3rd October 2022 initially using a batch of Enviro 200s previously operated by Bristol Community Transport as well as four Optare Solos transferred from the company's Brighton operations.
On 28 November 2022, The Big Lemon started operating services 11, 12 and 20 in Bath following these routes withdrawal by First West of England in October. Their routes in Bath are operated using 3 hired-in Wright StreetLites and an electric Higer Steed transferred from the company's operations in Brighton.

Services
As of January 2021, The Big Lemon operate 14 services (7 in Brighton, 4 in Bristol, 3 in Bath). Additionally, they operate shuttle buses for Brighton Metropolitan College and Legal & General 
Coaches ran on biodiesel that was refined from waste cooking oil until 2017. Buses run on diesel and batteries charged via mix of solar power and the main grid.

Fleet
As of April 2020, The Big Lemon has a fleet of 19 vehicles, including 3 minibuses and 16 regular buses. The minibuses don't operate regular bus routes, rather operating on the Legal & General and Brighton Metropolitan College shuttles.

See also
List of bus operators of the United Kingdom

References

External links

Company website

Bus operators in Brighton and Hove
Bus operators in Bristol
Bus operators in East Sussex
Transport in Brighton and Hove
Transport in East Sussex
British companies established in 2007